James Fisher (1876 – unknown) was a Scottish footballer. His regular position was as a forward. He was born in Stirling. He played for East Stirlingshire, St Bernard's, Aston Villa, King's Park, and Manchester United.

External links
MUFCInfo.com profile

1876 births
Footballers from Stirling
Scottish footballers
Aston Villa F.C. players
East Stirlingshire F.C. players
Manchester United F.C. players
Year of death missing
King's Park F.C. players
St Bernard's F.C. players
Association football forwards